Kirk Smeaton is a village and civil parish in the Selby District of North Yorkshire, England. It is located at the southern end of the county close to South Yorkshire and East Riding of Yorkshire. Historically the village was part of the West Riding of Yorkshire until 1974.

Geography
Kirk Smeaton and its sister village Little Smeaton face each other across the River Went, the most southerly boundary of the Celtic Kingdom of Elmet. A footbridge links the two, providing both villages with walks to Brockadale Nature Reserve and Wentbridge.

The Doncaster / North Yorkshire boundary lies close to the south of the village and, to the east, it begins to follow the River Went all the way to the River Don. A railway from the Leeds - Doncaster line past Drax Power Station used to run close to the south of the village, with a railway station that opened in 1885 and part of the Hull and Barnsley Railway. The station was closed to passengers in 1932 and the line closed completely in 1959.

Etymology
The name Smeaton is first attested in the Domesday Book of 1086, in the form Smedetone. This derives from Old English words smiþ (in its genitive plural form smiþa) and tūn ('farm, estate'), and thus once meant 'smiths' farm'. The kirk element of the name is first attested in 1311 and is a northern English dialect word for 'church', coming from the Old Norse word for 'church', kirkja. This element was added to the name to distinguish the settlement from nearby Little Smeaton.

History
The village is mentioned in the Domesday Book, along with Little Smeaton, with the land being tenanted by Ilbert of Lacey. In 1840, Earl Fitzwilliam donated land for the foundation of Kirk Smeaton CE J&I Primary School; it is a small school which is well regarded. A pre-school meet on-site in term-time; there is a breakfast club and after-school club. The school has a mixture of new and old buildings, a sports hall and a community room which can be hired out. It is a Church school and there are good links with the community and Church.

The village pub is the Shoulder of Mutton on Main Street. Black Sheep Ale is usually served, amongst other beers. A harvest auction at the pub raises money for charity. There is also a village post office.

In the 2001 Census, the population was 344, which had risen to 405 by the 2011 Census. In 2015, North Yorkshire County Council estimated the population to be at 390.

References

External links

 The Smeaton Villages
Smeaton Church
 Primary school

Civil parishes in North Yorkshire
Selby District
Villages in North Yorkshire